Cheruthana is a village in Alappuzha district in the Indian state of Kerala.

Demographics
 India census, Cheruthana had a population of 12944 with 6162 males and 6782 females.

References

Villages in Alappuzha district